Cuttle Brook is a   Local Nature Reserve in Thame in Oxfordshire. It is owned and managed by Thame Town Council.

There are seven entrances to this site close to Thame town centre. It has diverse habitats, including the brook and its banks, scrub, woodland, meadows, reed beds, hedges and sedge beds.

References

External links
Cuttlebrook nature reserve

Local nature reserves in Oxfordshire